Hoodtown is a novel by Christa Faust, first published in the United States in 2004.

Synopsis 
Hoodtown is the story of "X", a former rudo luchadora (bad-guy female wrestler) who fell from grace in the professional Lucha Libre world, and now resides in Hoodtown, her old stomping grounds. The former luchadora makes a modest living, still as a luchadora, but as a private luchadora, who dishes out pain in hourly sessions to masochistic men who are thrilled to be smacked around by Ms. X.

Her new job is interrupted when masked prostitutes in Hoodtown are found not only murdered, but left unmasked, which is every bit as horrible in itself as death, a great dishonor. X then becomes a self-taught private eye searching for the killer since the police, who do not reside in Hoodtown, and like most maskless people in this novel's society, spit upon masked folks as members of the lowest caste, are nonchalant about finding the murderer.

References

2004 American novels
Novels set in Mexico
Lucha libre